Panagoda Don Prince Solomon Anura Liyanage ( A.S.P. Liyanage) is a Sri Lankan businessman, television and film producer, and diplomat. On 10 March 2017, he was appointed as the Sri Lankan ambassador for Qatar.

Liyanage received his education at Nalanda College Colombo 
and began teaching, publishing a number of textbooks. In 1989, he established the ASP Group, a private real estate company, and served as its chairman and managing director. Liyanage was a Millennium Development Ambassador to the People's Summit during the 34th G8 summit in Hokkaido, Japan in 2008, and to the United Nations European headquarters in Geneva in 2007. Liyanage ran advertisements congratulating Barack Obama before his 2008 presidential victory, further raising his political profile.

Liyanage conducted the popular Sri Lankan celebrity TV program A.S.P Paduru Partiya for 7 years.  This program was awarded "best entertainment program" for 2008, 2009, 2010, and 2011. He also produced television and film adaptations of Suseema.

Liyanage ran in the Sri Lankan presidential election of 2010 and 2015. In the 2010 election, he achieved a distant third in preferential voting in the commercial capital of Colombo. However, like a number of minor candidates, Liyanage was entered as a "dummy candidate" to maximize benefits for a frontrunner (Mahinda Rajapaksa) under the election laws. Between the elections, Liyanage was appointed Sri Lankan High Commissioner to Nigeria. He has two daughters.

See also
List of Sri Lankan non-career diplomats

References

Sources
 A.S.P. Liyanage appointed as Sri Lankan Ambassador to Qatar
 A. S. P. Liyanage appointed as Sri Lankan Ambassador to Qatar
 PIM's MBA program in Doha patronised by Sri Lanka's new Ambassador and Central Province Governor
 Chartered Accountants of Sri Lanka hold annual event

Alumni of Nalanda College, Colombo
Candidates in the 2010 Sri Lankan presidential election
Candidates in the 2015 Sri Lankan presidential election
Candidates in the 2019 Sri Lankan presidential election
Living people
Sinhalese businesspeople
Sri Lankan philanthropists
Year of birth missing (living people)